Pirovsky District is an administrative and municipal district (raion), one of the forty-three in Krasnoyarsk Krai, Russia. It is located in the southwest of the krai and borders with Yeniseysky District in the north, Kazachinsky District in the east, Bolshemurtinsky District in the southeast and south, and with Birilyussky District in the west. Its administrative center is the rural locality (a selo) of Pirovskoye. Population:  9,150 (2002 Census);  The population of Pirovskoye accounts for 39.7% of the district's total population.

History
The district was founded on April 4, 1924.

Government
As of 2013, the Head of the district and the Chairman of the District Council is Alexander I. Yevseyev.

Notable people
Russian revolutionary Mikhail Petrashevsky is buried on the district's territory.

References

Notes

Sources

Districts of Krasnoyarsk Krai
States and territories established in 1924